Mount Brounov is a mountain,  high, standing  south of Mount Kibal'chich in the Payer Mountains of Queen Maud Land. It was first plotted from air photos by the Third German Antarctic Expedition, 1938–39. It was mapped from air photos and from surveys by the Sixth Norwegian Antarctic Expedition, 1956–60?; remapped by the Soviet Antarctic Expedition, 1960–61, and named after P.I. Brounov, a Soviet geographer.

References 

Mountains of Queen Maud Land
Princess Astrid Coast